Sir Gregory Botolf, also known as Sir Gregory Sweet-Lips was an English knight and cleric who fell foul of Henry VIII of England for his adherence to the papacy. He was pursued by Henry's agents in Belgium but was released due to papal pressure.

References

Year of birth missing
Year of death missing
People of the Tudor period
16th-century English people